Field hockey was introduced at the Youth Olympic Games at the inaugural edition in 2010 for both boys and girls. In 2010 Games hockey was outdoor format but FIH changed the format as hockey5s from 2014 Games.

Boys

Summaries

Team appearances

Girls

Summaries

Team appearances

Medal table
As of the 2018 Summer Youth Olympics.

See also
Field hockey at the Summer Olympics

References

External links
Youth Olympic Games

 
Youth Olympics
Sports at the Summer Youth Olympics